Linet Munyali (born 4 August 1987), professionally known as Size 8, is a Kenyan singer, songwriter and actress.  Formerly a secular artist, Size 8 is known for her singles "Shamba Boy" and "Moto". In April 2013, she released her first gospel single "Mateke". As an actress, she had a small role in the legal comedy Mashtaka.

Early life and education 

Born on 4 August 1987, Size 8 was raised in Maringo Estate in Nairobi. She is the sixth born of six other siblings to a Ugandan man and a Kenyan woman, both members of the clergy. In her high school, she got a scholarship in State House Girls and was luckily to later join the Hillcrest School.

Career 
Munyali was discovered by Clemo, a Kenyan producer and co-founder of Calif Records, when she auditioned locally and later signed on the Record label. She released "Shamba Boy", "Silali" and "Vidonge". As of April 2013, she confirmed to have crossed over to the gospel music industry, having been born again, and subsequently releasing her first single "Mateke". She has released others like "Moto", "Yuko na Wewe", "Jemedari" and "Afadhali Yesu".

Personal life 
Size 8 married to Samwel Muraya in September 2013. Together they have two children.

Filmography 

 Mashtaka

Awards and nominations

References 

1987 births
Living people
21st-century Kenyan women singers
Kenyan gospel musicians
Kenyan television actresses
People from Nairobi
21st-century Kenyan actresses